Walter Elmer Ekblaw (March 10, 1882 – June 7, 1949) was an American college professor who served as geologist, ornithologist and botanist on the Crocker Land Expedition (1913-1917).

Life and career
Walter Elmer Ekblaw was born in Champaign County, Illinois. He was  one of six children born to Andrew Ekblaw (1854-1923) and Ingrid (Johnson) Ekblaw (1860-1942) both of whom were Swedish immigrants. He  graduated from the University of Illinois with a B.A. in 1910. At the University, he was editor of the Daily Illini (1910). Together with fellow senior,  Clarence Foss Williams (1886-1971), he also organized the first University of Illinois homecoming on October 15, 1910.

He taught at the University of Illinois from 1910 to 1913.
He subsequently became a research associate with the American Museum of Natural History. He attended Clark University where he received a Ph.D. in 1926. He served as a professor of geography at Clark University from 1924 to 1949. In 1947, he received the Order of the Polar Star from King Gustav V of Sweden for his work in promoting good relations between Sweden and the United States. He died in 1949 and was buried at the Glen Cemetery in Ford County, Illinois.

Crocker Land Expedition

From 1913 to 1917, he served as geologist and botanist of the Crocker Land Expedition together with Maurice Cole Tanquary of the University of Illinois who served as the zoologist. The Crocker Land Expedition, which explored northern Greenland, was organized by Arctic explorers Donald Baxter MacMillan.  The expedition was sponsored by the American Museum of Natural History, the American Geographical Society, and the University of Illinois' Museum of Natural History. 
Members of the ill-fated expedition, including Ekblaw,  were rescued by the ship Neptune, commanded by  Robert Bartlett in 1917.  On his return to the United States,  Ekblaw wrote a number of papers including The importance of nivation as an erosive factor and of soil flow as a transporting agency in northern Greenland (Proceedings of the National Academy of Sciences, Vol. 4, 1918, p. 288-93), and also one on The food birds of the Smith Sound Eskimos (Wilson Bulletin, Vol. 31 (o.s.), Vol. 26 (n.s.), No. 106, 1919, p. 1-5). Later publications dealt with The ecological relations of the polar Eskimo (Ecology, Vol. 2, 1921, p. 132-44) and Eskimo dogs forgotten heroes (Natural History, Vol. 37,1936, p. 173-84).

Journals from Maurice Tanquary, Ekblaw, Donald and Mirriam MacMillan are available online at the George J. Mitchell Department of Special Collections & Archives website. Digitization of materials at Bowdoin College related to the Crocker Land Expedition generously funded by the Gladys Krieble Delmas Foundation in 2016.

Selected works
Correlation of the Devonian System of the Rock Island Region (1912)  
Stratigraphy and Paleontology of the Devonian System in Rock Island County, Illinois (1912) 
Along Unknown Shores: Narratives of Exploration in the Far North  (1918)

References

Other sources
Crocker Land Expedition to the north polar regions(American Museum of Natural History and the American Geographical Society, University of Illinois)

Related reading
Hunt, Harrison J. and Ruth Hunt Thompson  (1980) North to the Horizon: Searching for Peary's Crocker Land (Down East Publishing) 
Horwood, Harold  (2010) Bartlett: The Great Explorer (Doubleday Canada)

External links
Crocker Land Expedition Collection from the Arctic (Spurlock Museum.  University of Illinois at Urbana-Champaign)
Crocker Land Expedition (Board of Trustees of the University of Illinois)

1882 births
1949 deaths
People from Champaign County, Illinois
Clark University alumni
University of Minnesota alumni
American ornithologists
American botanists
Crocker Land Expedition
American Lutherans
American people of Swedish descent
Order of the Polar Star
20th-century American zoologists
20th-century American geologists
20th-century Lutherans